72 Cadogan Square is a Grade II* listed house in Cadogan Square, London SW1.

The house was built in the British Queen Anne Revival style in 1878, and the architect was Richard Norman Shaw.

References

Grade II* listed buildings in the Royal Borough of Kensington and Chelsea
Grade II* listed houses in London
Houses completed in 1878
Houses in the Royal Borough of Kensington and Chelsea
Queen Anne architecture in the United Kingdom
Richard Norman Shaw buildings